The 2017–18 BCHL season was the 56th season of the British Columbia Hockey League (BCHL). The seventeen teams from the Interior, Island and Mainland divisions played 58-game schedules. The 2017 BCHL Showcase, hosted in Chilliwack, shortly after the start of the season from September 20 to 24, 2017.

In March, the top teams from each division played for the Fred Page Cup, the BCHL Championship, won by the Wenatchee Wild. From there, they represented the league in the Doyle Cup, where they played and won a best-of-seven series against the Alberta Junior Hockey League champion Spruce Grove Saints to determine who represents the Pacific region in the Canadian Junior Hockey League championship, the Royal Bank Cup, held in Chilliwack, British Columbia, by the Chilliwack Chiefs.

League changes
 The Wenatchee Wild were moved to the Interior division.
 The first round bye for the 1st and 2nd seed interior teams were eliminated. These teams face one of two wildcard teams consisting of the top two teams out of the three that finished in last place in their division. (5th in Mainland, 5th in Island, 7th in Interior)
 With the dissolution of the Western Canada Cup, the Doyle Cup was reinstated and to be contested by the BCHL and AJHL champions with a best-of-seven series starting on April 27.

Standings
Note:  GP = Games Played, W = Wins, L = Losses, T = Ties, OTL = Overtime Losses, Pts = Points

Standings listed on the official league website.

2017–18 BCHL Fred Page Cup playoffs

Division playoffs

Doyle Cup

Scoring leaders
GP = Games Played, G = Goals, A = Assists, P = Points, PIM = Penalties In Minutes

Leading goaltenders
Note: GP = Games Played, Mins = Minutes Played, W = Wins, L = Losses, T = Ties, OTL = Overtime Losses, GA = Goals Against, SO = Shutouts, Sv% = Save Percentage, GAA = Goals Against Average.

Award winners
Brett Hull Trophy (Top Scorer): Jasper Weatherby, Wenatchee Wild (37 goals, 37 assists, 74 points)
Best Defenceman: Cooper Zech, Wenatchee Wild
Bruce Allison Memorial Trophy (Rookie of the Year): Alex Newhook, Victoria Grizzlies
Bob Fenton Trophy (Most Sportsmanlike): Ben Poisson, Prince George Spruce Kings
Top Goaltender: Ty Taylor, Vernon Vipers
Wally Forslund Memorial Trophy (Best Goaltending Duo): Ty Taylor & Anthony Yamnitsky, Vernon Vipers (1.98 combined GAA)
Vern Dye Memorial Trophy (regular-season MVP): Jasper Weatherby, Wenatchee Wild
Joe Tennant Memorial Trophy (Coach of the Year): Bliss Littler, Wenatchee Wild
Ron Boileau Memorial Trophy (Best Regular Season Record): Penticton Vees, 86 pts
Fred Page Cup (League Champions): Wenatchee Wild

Players selected in 2018 NHL Entry Draft
Rd2: 48 Jonathan Tychonick – Ottawa Senators (Penticton Vees)
Rd3: 81 Seth Barton – Detroit Red Wings (Trail Smoke Eaters)
Rd4: 99 Stanislav Devin – Vegas Golden Knights (Wenatchee Wild)
Rd4: 104 Jasper Weatherby – San Jose Sharks (Wenatchee Wild)
Rd5: 126 Dennis Crookshank – Ottawa Senators (Langley Rivermen)
Rd7: 190 Brett Stapley – Montreal Canadiens (Vernon Vipers)
Rd7: 214 Ty Taylor – Tampa Bay Lightning (Vernon Vipers)

See also
2017 in ice hockey
2018 in ice hockey

References

External links
Official Website of the British Columbia Hockey League
Official Website of the Canadian Junior Hockey League

BCHL
British Columbia Hockey League seasons